William Henry Lawrence Peter Wentworth-Fitzwilliam, 8th Earl Fitzwilliam, DSO (31 December 1910 – 13 May 1948), styled Viscount Milton before 1943, was a British soldier, nobleman, and peer, with a seat in the House of Lords.

Early life
The fifth child and only son of the 7th Earl Fitzwilliam, he was born at the family's seat of Wentworth Woodhouse. On 20 July 1929, after serving as a Cadet in the Eton College Contingent (June Division) of the Officer Training Corps, he was commissioned as a second lieutenant into the Royal Scots Greys on the Supplementary Reserve of Officers.

Second World War
During the Second World War, Lord Milton (as he then was) served with distinction in the Commandos and later with the Special Operations Executive, gaining a Distinguished Service Order.

Family life
Milton married, on 19 April 1933, Olive Dorothea "Obby" Plunket (died 1975), a daughter of Benjamin Plunket, Bishop of Tuam, Killala and Achonry, and a granddaughter of William Plunket, 4th Baron Plunket, who was Archbishop of Dublin. They had one daughter, Lady Anne Juliet Dorothea Maud Wentworth-Fitzwilliam, born on 24 January 1935. In 1943 he inherited the Earldom and a great fortune in land, houses, and art, from his father.

In Lord Fitzwilliam's later years his marriage was in disarray, partly due to Olive's alcoholism, and at the time of his death he was seeking a divorce in order to marry someone else. From 1946 he had been romantically linked with the widowed Kathleen Cavendish, Marchioness of Hartington, sister of the future U.S. President John F. Kennedy. She was killed with him in an air crash on 13 May 1948, although the nature of their relationship was not made clear in the newspaper accounts at the time.

On his death, leaving no son, Fitzwilliam's peerages passed to his second cousin once removed, Eric Spencer Wentworth-Fitzwilliam, but his fortune, then estimated at £45 million, including half of the Wentworth Woodhouse estate, the Coolattin estate in County Wicklow, Ireland, and a large part of the Fitzwilliam art collection, were inherited by his thirteen-year-old daughter, the present Lady Juliet Tadgell.

In popular culture
 Fitzwilliam is portrayed by Thomas Gibson in the television mini-series The Kennedys of Massachusetts (1990) and by Larry Carter in the film Lives and Deaths of the Poets (2011).

Ancestry

References

External links
Peter Wentworth-Fitzwilliam, 8th Earl Fitzwilliam

1910 births
1948 deaths
Military personnel from Yorkshire
Companions of the Distinguished Service Order
Royal Scots Greys officers
British Army personnel of World War II
British Special Operations Executive personnel
Victims of aviation accidents or incidents in France
British Army Commandos officers
Earls in the Peerage of Great Britain
Earls Fitzwilliam